Lathyrus rigidus is a species of wild pea known by the common name stiff pea. It is native to the Modoc Plateau and surrounding areas in the western United States from northeastern California to Idaho. It is a plant of the sagebrush scrub and other habitat in the region. This is a perennial herb forming a clump of short, erect stems. The fruit is a hairless legume pod.

External links
Calflora Database: Lathyrus rigidus (Rigid pea,  Stiff pea)
Jepson Manual eFlora (TJM2) treatment of Lathyrus rigidus
USDA Plants Profile

UC CalPhotos gallery

rigidus
Flora of California
Flora of Idaho
Flora of Nevada
Flora of Oregon
Flora of the Great Basin
~
Critically endangered flora of California
Flora without expected TNC conservation status